Highway 933 is a provincial highway in the Canadian province of Saskatchewan. It runs from Highway 106 until it transitions into Highway 920. Highway 933 is about 10 km (6 mi.) long.

See also 
Roads in Saskatchewan
Transportation in Saskatchewan

References 

933